Cassidy Glacier is a glacier  long and  wide, flowing northeast into upper Taylor Glacier between Depot Nunatak and the northwest end of the Quartermain Mountains, in Victoria Land. The descriptive names "South-West Arm" and "South Arm" were applied to this glacier and to the part of Ferrar Glacier south of Knobhead, respectively, by the British National Antarctic Expedition, 1901–04. Subsequent mapping has shown that the glacier described here is part of the Taylor Glacier system.

The glacier was named by the Advisory Committee on Antarctic Names in 1992 after William A. Cassidy, Department of Geology and Planetary Science, University of Pittsburgh, who in 13 field seasons, from 1976–90, led United States Antarctic Research Program teams in the investigation and collection of Antarctic meteorites from diverse sites through Victoria Land and southward to Lewis Cliff, adjacent to the Queen Alexandra Range.

References 

Glaciers of McMurdo Dry Valleys